HMS Lyme was a 28-gun, sixth-rate frigate of the Royal Navy. Originally ordered as a 24 gun ship to the draft of the French privateer Tyger. They were actually completed with 28 guns including the four smaller weapons on the quarterdeck, but the latter were not included in the ship's official establishment until 22 September 1756. The two ships differed in detail, Unicorn having a beakhead bow, a unicorn figurehead, two-light quarter galleries and only five pairs of quarterdeck gunports, while Lyme had a round bow, a lion figurehead, three-light quarter galleries and six pairs of quarterdeck gunports.

Lyme was named on 2 August 1748, and commissioned in September 1748 under Captain Charles Proby, while still building in Deptford Dockyard under the direction of Master Shipwright John Holland. After her launch, she was fitted out there, finally sailing when completed on 8 February 1752. Her total initial cost had been £12,282.0.1d (including fitting out costs).  She sailed for the Mediterranean in May 1749.  Returning home, she was fitted out at Portsmouth Dockyard from December 1750 to March 1751 (at a cost of £389.6.9d) for bearing the new ambassador to Tripoli out to the Mediterranean.

After her first commission finished in 1752, she was surveyed on 1 July 1753, and then underwent a small repair and was fitted out at Plymouth Dockyard (under Admiralty Order on 4 December 1753, for a total cost of £1,519.6.3d) in February to March 1754.  She was recommissioned under Captain Samuel Faulkner, but some months later he was replaced by Captain Edward Vernon, under whom the Lyme joined the Western Squadron based in Plymouth. In March 1758 she was under Captain James Baker, in the Mediterranean to 1759.

Back home, and under Vernon's command again, she was surveyed again on 7 June 1760, and then underwent a small repair and was fitted out at Chatham Dockyard (for a total cost of £4,211.6.4d) in May to August 1760, before sailing for the Baltic.

References 

 Robert Gardiner, The First Frigates, Conway Maritime Press, London 1992. .
 David Lyon, The Sailing Navy List, Conway Maritime Press, London 1993. .
 Rif Winfield, British Warships in the Age of Sail, 1714 to 1792, Seaforth Publishing, London 2007. .

Shipwrecks in the Baltic Sea
1748 ships
Maritime incidents in 1760
Sixth-rate frigates of the Royal Navy